Punchana District is one of thirteen districts of the Maynas Province in Peru.

References

Districts of the Maynas Province
Districts of the Loreto Region